is a Japanese short track speed skater. He competed at the 1994, 1998, 2002 and the 2010 Winter Olympics.

References

External links
 
 Satoru Terao at the ISU
 Satoru Terao at the-sports.org

1975 births
Living people
Japanese male short track speed skaters
Olympic short track speed skaters of Japan
Short track speed skaters at the 1994 Winter Olympics
Short track speed skaters at the 1998 Winter Olympics
Short track speed skaters at the 2002 Winter Olympics
Short track speed skaters at the 2006 Winter Olympics
Sportspeople from Aomori Prefecture
Asian Games medalists in short track speed skating
Short track speed skaters at the 1999 Asian Winter Games
Short track speed skaters at the 2003 Asian Winter Games
Short track speed skaters at the 2007 Asian Winter Games
Medalists at the 1999 Asian Winter Games
Medalists at the 2003 Asian Winter Games
Medalists at the 2007 Asian Winter Games
Asian Games silver medalists for Japan
Asian Games bronze medalists for Japan